Miklós is a given name or surname, the Hungarian form of the Greek  (English Nicholas), and may refer to:

In Hungarian politics

 Miklós Bánffy, Hungarian nobleman, politician, and novelist
 Miklós Horthy, Regent of the Kingdom of Hungary
 Miklós Kállay, Hungarian politician who served as Prime Minister of Hungary during World War II
 Miklós Lukáts, Hungarian politician and state secretary
 Miklós Németh, Prime Minister of Hungary
 Miklós Pálffy (1657 – 1732), Hungarian nobleman 
 Miklós Wesselényi, Hungarian statesman

In Hungarian literature
 Miklós Radnóti, Hungarian poet from Budapest who fell victim to the Holocaust
 Miklós Vámos, Hungarian writer
 Miklós Mészöly, Hungarian writer

In artistry

 Miklós Barabás, Hungarian painter
 Miklós Izsó, Hungarian sculptor
 Miklós Ybl, one of Europe's leading architects in the mid to late nineteenth century

In sport
 Miklós Fehér, Hungarian football player
 Miklós Gaál, football player of Hajduk Split
 Miklos Tassilo Csillaghy, Italian equestrian
 Miklós Herczeg, Hungarian football player
 Miklós Kovács International football player and coach
Miklós Mandl, birth name of Nickolas Muray (1892-1965), Hungarian-born American photographer and Olympic fencer
 Miklos Molnar, Danish football (soccer) player
 Miklós Németh (sportsman), Hungarian javelin thrower

In military

 Miklós Horthy, Regent of Hungary during the interwar years and throughout most of World War II
 Miklós Steinmetz, Hungarian-born Soviet Red Army captain

In other fields

 Miklós Ajtai, (born 1946) Hungarian-American computer scientist
 Miklós "Mickey" Hargitay, Hungarian-American bodybuilder and actor
 Miklós Jancsó, Hungarian film director and screenwriter
 Miklos Kanitz, Hungarian-Canadian Holocaust survivor
 Miklós Laczkovich, Hungarian mathematician noted for his work on geometric measure theory
 Miklós Nyiszli, Jewish prisoner doctor at Auschwitz
 Paulo Miklos, Brazilian rock musician.
 Miklos Perlus (born 1977), Canadian actor and screenwriter
 Miklós Rózsa, Hungarian-American composer
 Miklós Szabó (middle-distance runner) (1908-2000), Hungarian middle distance runner
 Miklós Szabó (long-distance runner) (born 1928), Hungarian long distance runner
 Miklós Zrínyi, aka Nikola Zrinski 17th century military leader, statesman and poet

In fiction
 Miklos Atreides, fictional historical character in Frank Herbert's Dune universe
 Lukas Miklos, character in the Left Behind novel series
 Miklós Molnar, comedic character portrayed on television by Ernie Kovacs
 Miklós Toldi, a legendary strong hero in Hungarian folklore.

See also
 Mikloš (surname)

References

Hungarian masculine given names
Hungarian-language surnames

hu:Miklós